"Hotline Bling" is a song recorded by Canadian rapper Drake, which serves as the lead single from his fourth studio album Views (2016). The song is credited as a bonus track on the album. It was made available for digital download on July 31, 2015, through Cash Money, Young Money and Republic.

Music critics were complimentary about the presentation of Drake's emotional side, as well as its production, but criticized its lyrics. A music video directed by Director X was released two months later; it subsequently gained popularity on YouTube and spawned several parodies. The song was included on several year-end critics' polls.

"Hotline Bling" reached number two on the US Billboard Hot 100. It also reached number three in Drake's native Canada and the United Kingdom. The song won the award for Favorite Rap/Hip-Hop Song at the 2016 American Music Awards. It also received two wins at the 2017 Grammy Awards for Best Rap Song and Best Rap/Sung Performance.

Composition 
"Hotline Bling" is a pop and R&B song written by Drake and Nineteen85, the latter of whom also produced the song. The song was composed in D minor with a tempo of 135 beats per minute in common time with a chord progression of Bbmaj7Am7. The song was directly inspired by DRAM's "Cha Cha" and was originally seen to be a remix, with the song premiering on Beats 1 OVO Sound Radio as "Hotline Bling (Cha Cha Remix)". The song's instrumental heavily samples R&B singer Timmy Thomas's 1972 song "Why Can't We Live Together".

Music video 

On October 4, 2015, Drake announced a music video for the track via his Instagram account. The video was inspired by Sean Paul's "Gimme The Light" clip. The video was financed by Apple Inc., and released on October 19, 2015, via Apple Music under a timed exclusivity agreement. The Director X-directed video was inspired by the work of American artist James Turrell. X has stated that he hopes that the video inspires men to dance more.

Rap-Up wrote that Drake "shows just how suave he can be with his moves" in this video. Evan Minsker of Pitchfork called it a "pretty minimal clip". The site also named "Hotline Bling" the seventh best music video of 2015.

The video, which has inspired many memes and parodies, including a commercial from T-Mobile during Super Bowl 50 featuring Drake himself (where representatives of a cellular operator attempt to make Drake add disclaimer-like caveats to the song's lyrics), helped the song rise in chart position according to NME. The song was parodied in the Saturday Night Live episode "Donald Trump/Sia", in which Trump briefly sang and danced while playing Drake's accountant. One of the most popular memes made from the music video is Wii Shop Bling, a mash up between Hotline Bling and the theme music for the Wii Shop Channel.

As of February 2022, the music video has received more than 1.8 billion views on YouTube.

Critical response 
The song received mixed reviews. Leor Galil of the Chicago Reader praised Drake's performance in "Hotline Bling," stating that he "sounds hurt, neglected, and confused even while he's admonishing his ex," and that "it's hard to imagine anyone else pulling off this kind of song with the same verve".  Jayson Greene of Pitchfork selected "Hotline Bling" as the "Best New Track" of the day, praising its "muted and intimate" beat and declaring it a "halting, aching song" about a man "a little too concerned" for a woman that could be a "rewrite" of "Roxanne" by The Police. Brad Wete of NPR hailed the song as both "remarkably catchy and damp with boo-hoo reflection," writing that "musically, it twinkles with bright organ riffs and boasts a bass line fit to thump in clubs" while its lyrics feature Drake "deeply wondering aloud, channeling the jealous ex in all of us". Rhian Daly of NME described the track's "simple and minimal" production as "secondary to Drake’s emotions". Rolling Stone ranked "Hotline Bling" at number 3 on its year-end list to find the 50 best songs of 2015. Billboard ranked "Hotline Bling" at number 2 on its year-end critics' poll for 2015: "In a trio of freebies Drake plopped on SoundCloud in July, "Hotline Bling" was the only non-diss track. Backed by a tropical, groovy melody, "Hotline Bling" finds Drake giving a rap a hard pass and singing his heart out for some late-night loving through the phone. The record caught some drama, initially being referred to as a remix to Virginia rapper D.R.A.M.'s "Cha Cha." Still, the Toronto MVP got his dance on for the uber-viral video parodied by everyone from presidential candidate Donald Trump to Toronto Councillor Norm Kelly". Pitchfork named "Hotline Bling" the second best song of 2015, after Kendrick Lamars "Alright". Time named "Hotline Bling" the eighth-best song of 2015. The Village Voice named "Hotline Bling" the best single released in 2015 on their annual year-end critics' poll, Pazz & Jop. In 2021, it was listed at No. 373 on Rolling Stone's "Top 500 Greatest Songs of All Time".

"Hotline Bling" also received criticism for the perceived sexist and controlling attitude expressed by the male narrator toward his female ex. Allyson Shiffman of Bullett took issue with the "super sexist lyrics," explaining that "while [the song is] packaged as a good old fashioned 'Why doesn't bae like me anymore?' Drake tune," what it is "really saying is, 'You used to wanna bone me all the time and now that I've left the 6, you've gotten a life of your own and I'm not okay with that'". Tahirah Hairston of Fusion wrote that, in the song, "Drake is distraught that his ex has moved on," but because he "opts for condescendingly slut-shaming her" and "dictating where she does and doesn't belong," it "comes off so petty that you forget his feelings are hurt".

Covers and usage in media

Canadian singer Justin Bieber recorded a cover version of the song and released it on October 30, 2015. At the 2016 iHeartRadio Music Awards the alternative version was nominated for the Best Cover Song. Rapper Lil Wayne released his own version of the song from his mixtape No Ceilings 2. Singer Erykah Badu released a rewrite of the song on her 2015 mixtape But You Caint Use My Phone titled "Cel U Lar Device". American singer Billie Eilish released a cover of "Hotline Bling" as the B-side of "Party Favor", on a pink 7-inch vinyl on April 21, 2018, coinciding with Record Store Day for that year. Eilish's cover was later released for digital download and streaming in June 2018 by Darkroom and Interscope Records. Sam Moore of NME described the genre of Eilish's cover of "Hotline Bling" as "delicate indie pop".

W magazine uploaded a video with 13 celebrities reading the lyrics of the song in December 2015. The song was featured on the episode "She Gets Revenge" from American Horror Story: Hotel. "Hotline Bling" was the subject of a Super Bowl 50 advertisement for T-Mobile, in which Drake is interrupted by executives of cellphones provider seeking to make "improvements" to its lyrics. A variation of Drake's dancing in the music video was included in the multiplayer section of 2016's Uncharted 4: A Thief's End, renamed to "Bling Bling". The dance is also featured in 2014's Destiny, referred to only as "Strange Dance". Heroes of the Storm features a playable character named Dehaka, whose dance also mimics Drake's. On March 24, 2017, a Red Nose Day short that served as a sequel to the 2003 film Love Actually premiered and featured Hugh Grant reprising his dancing skills to "Hotline Bling".

The dance moves in the music video also inspired the opening sequence to the anime Keep Your Hands Off Eizouken!, according to a Crunchyroll interview with to one of its animators, Abel Gongora.

Commercial performance 
"Hotline Bling" entered the US Billboard Hot 100 chart dated August 22, 2015 at number 66. Its chart debut was fueled primarily by digital download sales, with 41,000 copies sold in its first week. The song soon became Drake's first top 10 in two years when the song reached number nine. It has since peaked at number two on the chart dated October 24, 2015, tying as his second highest-charting single as a lead act with "Best I Ever Had" which reached number two in 2009. The song has peaked at number two for five non-consecutive weeks, behind both "The Hills" by The Weeknd and "Hello" by Adele. As of February 2016, the song has sold over 2 million copies in the United States. "Hotline Bling" remained in the top ten of this chart for nineteen weeks before dropping out on February 13, 2016.

In the United Kingdom, "Hotline Bling" peaked at number three on the UK Singles Chart, becoming Drake's highest-charting song there (at the time) as a lead artist. The song also peaked at the top of the UK R&B Chart. On November 27, 2015, "Hotline Bling" received gold certification by the British Phonographic Industry.

Charts

Weekly charts

Year-end charts

Decade-end charts

Certifications

Release history

See also
Carrie & Lowell Live, featuring a cover of the song by Sufjan Stevens

References

2015 singles
2015 songs
Cash Money Records singles
Drake (musician) songs
Internet memes
Music videos directed by Director X
Republic Records singles
Young Money Entertainment singles
Interscope Records singles
Song recordings produced by Nineteen85
Songs written by Drake (musician)
Songs written by Nineteen85
Grammy Award for Best Rap/Sung Collaboration
Songs about telephone calls